Steffen Deibler (born 10 July 1987) is a German former competitive swimmer from Biberach an der Riß. From 2009 to 2018 he was the world record holder for the 50 m butterfly (short course).

Swimming career
Deibler specialized in short distances in the butterfly and freestyle. He graduated in 2007 at Pestalozzi-Gymnasium Biberach and started to study environment engineering in October 2008. As a teenager, Deibler trained at the TG Biberach under coach Gerold Seifert. The study was the reason to change is training base to Hamburg. At the 2008 German swimming championships, he won 50 m and 100 m freestyle and qualified for the 2008 Summer Olympics. He was second behind Paul Biedermann in the 200 m freestyle. In November 2009, Deibler set a new 50 meter butterfly short course world record in Aachen, with a time of 22.06, beating the previous record of Amaury Leveaux by 0.12 seconds. At the FINA World Cup 2009 in Berlin, he became the first person to swim 50 m butterfly within 22 seconds in a 25 m pool, when he improved his world record to 21.80 seconds.

At the 2008 Summer Olympics, Deibler finished in 38th, 33rd and 15th place in the 50 m, 100 m, and 4 × 100 m freestyle events. He improved at the 2012 Olympics, finishing fourth in the 100 m butterfly and sixth in the 4 × 100 m medley relay. At the 2016 Summer Olympics in Rio de Janeiro, he competed in the 100 m butterfly where he finished 18th in the heats and did not qualify for the semifinals. He also competed as a member of the 4 x 100 m medley relay team that finished in 7th place.

International career
European Junior Swimming Championships 2004 in Lisbon:
 2nd place in the 4 × 100 m freestyle relay

European Junior Swimming Championships 2005 in Budapest:
 1st in the 50 m freestyle (0:22.26 min)
 1st in the 100 m freestyle (0:49.26 min)
 1st in the 4 × 100 m freestyle
 1st in the 4 × 100 m medley swimming

European Short Course Swimming Championships 2005 in Trieste:
 1st in the 4×50 m medley swimming
 2nd in the 100 m freestyle 0:47.43 min)
 4th in the 50 m freestyle (0:21.56 min)

European Short Course Swimming Championships 2007 in Debrecen:
 1st in the 4×50 m medley swimming
 3rd in the 4×50m freestyle

German swimming championships 2008 in Berlin
 1st in the 100 m freestyle (0:48.55 min – German record – qualification for the 2008 Summer Olympics)

Aachener Schwimmfest 2009 in Aachen:
 50 m butterfly (00:22.06 min) world record

World cup Berlin 2009:
 1st in the 50 m butterfly (00:21.80 min) world record
 2nd in the 100 m butterfly (00:49.23 min)
 3rd in the 50 m freestyle (00:20.73 min)

Personal bests

Key: WR = World record

Personal life
His younger brother Markus also competed in swimming at the 2008 and 2012 Olympics.

References

External links
 Website of Steffen and Markus Deibler 
 
 Steffen DEIBLER results at les-sports.info

1987 births
Living people
People from Biberach an der Riss
Sportspeople from Tübingen (region)
German male swimmers
German male butterfly swimmers
German male freestyle swimmers
Swimmers at the 2008 Summer Olympics
Swimmers at the 2012 Summer Olympics
Swimmers at the 2016 Summer Olympics
Olympic swimmers of Germany
World record setters in swimming
Medalists at the FINA World Swimming Championships (25 m)
European Aquatics Championships medalists in swimming